Long Branch Park 1983 is a two CD live set by Papa John Creach released on May 10, 2011 on the Floating World label.

Background
The material was recorded at Long Branch Park, Liverpool, NY in June 1983 and is one of his few live performances.

Track listing

Disc one
All Lengths adapted from CD Universe, except track 14.
 "Intro" - 1:11
 "Fiddler Jam" - 2:03
 "Son of Fiddler" - 3:13
 "Country Boy, City Man" - 3:13
 "Country Girl" - 10:10
 "Get Fiddler" - 3:58
 "Inphasion" - 3:21
 "Georgia" - 6:57
 "Pop Stop" - 5:09
 "Montuno Grande" - 4:23

Disc two
 "Band Intro" - 1:23
 "Cast Your Bread Upon the Water" - 7:30
 "Fiddlesticks" - 6:23
 "Let's Get Dancin" 6:24
 "Somewhere Over the Rainbow" 8:29
 "John's Other" 9:50
 "Southern Strut" 4:46

References

2011 albums
Papa John Creach albums